The  2008 Battle of North Cotabato was a military confrontation between the Armed Forces of the Philippines and a rogue Moro Islamic Liberation Front (MILF) faction under the command of Umbra Kato in North Cotabato, a province of Mindanao, in the Philippines.

A thousand MILF rebels under the command of Umbra Kato seized control of thirty-five villages in the North Cotabato. Two thousand Philippine troops with helicopters and artillery were sent to the seized area on August 9 to liberate it from the rebels. The MILF had wanted North Cotabato to be included in the Autonomous Region in Muslim Mindanao (ARMM). The Filipino government and MILF had been negotiating for the inclusion of the province, but the Supreme Court of the Philippines had struck down the proposal after hearing concern from local Christian leaders in the region.

The rebel troops were ordered to leave the area by their commanders, but the contingents under Kato refused to leave the villages they had occupied. The Philippine Army responded on August 9 by bombarding them. The next day, the government forces moved to retake the villages, recapturing two of them from the rebels.

Sources
 https://web.archive.org/web/20120915155834/http://afp.google.com/article/ALeqM5hqj_Uwh8CPUyGJS7MKQQqApGO_pw
 http://www.csmonitor.com/2008/0811/p99s01-duts.html

Moro conflict
Cotabato_conflict
History of Cotabato
North Cotobato